Camille: The Fate of a Coquette is a 1926 short film by Ralph Barton. Its development is described in Bruce Kellner's biography of Barton, The Last Dandy (1991).

This 33-minute silent film was compiled from Barton's home movies and is loosely based on the French novel, La Dame aux Camélias (1848), by Alexandre Dumas, fils. The homemade film is a mish mash of dos and don'ts i.e. a group of people presumably drinking real alcohol from liquor bottles during prohibition. The appearance of a toilet in a bathroom scene had almost never be done in American silent films of the time, with the exception of The Crowd (1928).

Appearances are made by Charlie Chaplin, Paul Robeson, Anita Loos, H. L. Mencken, Theodore Dreiser, Sinclair Lewis, Paul Claudel, and many other socialites of 1920s Paris, France and New York City, U.S.

Plot summary

Cast
Paul Robeson - Alexandre Dumas fils
Sinclair Lewis - Allegorical figures
Anita Loos - Camille
George Jean Nathan - Arthur
Donald Freeman - Gustave
Pauline Starke - Nan
Theodore Dreiser - Gas-House Gleasen
Sherwood Anderson - Mr. X
Clarence Darrow - August Peters
Lois Moran - Alice Brown
Édouard Bourdet - The Earl of Idaho
Jacques Copeau- Radavanni
Georges Lepape - The Weasel
Denise Bourdet - Olga Petroff
Bernard Boulet de Monuel - Dou-Dou-Dou
Sacha Guitry - Mancha y Zaragosa
Yvonne Printemps - Angèle Hemingway
Alfred Knopf - Abd-el-Hammam
Serge Koussevitzky - Grand Duke Michael
Wally Toscanini - Madge
H.L. Mencken - Andrew Volstead
Joseph Hergesheimer - Spirit of Valentino
Aileen Pringle - Estelle
Marie-Blanche de Polignac - Les Pâcheux
Julia Hoyt - Kitty
Charles Chaplin - Mike
Ethel Barrymore- Olympe
John Emerson - Count de Varville
Sem - Archbishop of Canterbury
Paul Morand - Lars Nelson
Patsy Ruth Miller - Sadie
Morris Gest - Butter-and-Egg Man
Lili Darvas - Queenie
Rex Ingram - Charles Stewart Parnell
Paul Claudel - Jean Bart
W. Somerset Maugham - Monsieur Duval
Roland Young - Lord Kyne
Sultan of Morocco - Sultan of Morocco
Frank Keenan - Prince von Lindenstein
Ferenc Molnár - Drnskaqrsk
Max Reinhardt - Siegfried
Charles G. Shaw - Armand Duval
T.R. Smith - Doctor
Zéna Naylor - Nurse
Mary Hutchins - Nanine
Richard Barthelmess - Gaston
Chauncey Olcott - Pierre
Nikita Balieff - Ivon
Dorothy Gish - Grace
James Rennie - Philippe
Carmel Myers - Agatha
Mrs. Thomas Ward - The Virgin Mary

References

External links
 

1926 films
American black-and-white films
French-language films
American silent short films
Films based on Camille
1926 drama films
1926 short films
American drama short films
1920s English-language films
1920s American films
Silent American drama films